Events from the year 1703 in the Kingdom of Scotland.

Incumbents 
 Monarch – Anne
 Secretary of State – James Douglas, 2nd Duke of Queensberry, jointly with George Mackenzie, 1st Viscount Tarbat

Law officers 
 Lord Advocate – Sir James Stewart
 Solicitor General for Scotland – William Carmichael

Judiciary 
 Lord President of the Court of Session – Lord North Berwick
 Lord Justice General – Lord Lothian until 15 February
 Lord Justice Clerk – Lord Prestonhall

Events 
 13 April – Major-General David Colyear, Lord Portmore, is elevated to the style of Earl of Portmore in the Peerage of Scotland.
 21 April – the Edinburgh "Company of Quenching of Fire", i.e., a fire brigade, is formed.
 6 May – the last Parliament of Scotland formed in Edinburgh from the General Election held the previous year.
 Acts of the Parliament of Scotland passed:
 Act anent Peace and War, providing that, following the death of Anne, Queen of Great Britain without direct heirs, no future monarch of Scotland and England can take Scotland to war without the explicit consent of its parliament.
 Wine Act, allowing Scots legally to import French wine.
 Act of Security, allowing the Parliament to appoint a Protestant successor to the monarch in Scotland. Bill passed in September but royal assent refused by the Lord High Commissioner until 1704.
 Queen Anne revives the Order of the Thistle and creates other new titles in the Peerage of Scotland: Duke of Atholl, Duke of Douglas, Earl of Cromartie, Earl of Glasgow, Earl of Hopetoun, Earl of Rosebery, Earl of Stair, Viscount of Garnock, Viscount Mount Stuart and Viscount of Primrose.
 Martin Martin publishes A Description of the Western Islands of Scotland.

Births 
 5 January – James Hamilton, 5th Duke of Hamilton (died 1743)

Deaths 
 15 February – Robert Kerr, 1st Marquess of Lothian (born 1636)
 6 May – John Murray, 1st Marquess of Atholl (born 1631)
 25 September – Archibald Campbell, 1st Duke of Argyll, privy councillor (born 1658)

See also 
 Timeline of Scottish history

References 

 
Years of the 18th century in Scotland
1700s in Scotland